The 67th annual Venice International Film Festival held in Venice, Italy, took place from 1 to 11 September 2010. American film director and screenwriter Quentin Tarantino was the head of the Jury. The opening film of the festival was Darren Aronofsky's Black Swan, and the closing film was Julie Taymor's The Tempest. John Woo was awarded the Golden Lion for Lifetime Achievement prior to the start of the Festival.

The Golden Lion for the Best Film In Competition was awarded to Somewhere, directed by Sofia Coppola. The Silver Lion Award for Best Director was given to Álex de la Iglesia, for A Sad Trumpet Ballad. In a break with tradition of limiting a film to receiving no more than one major award, the Special Jury Prize and the Best Actor (the Volpi Cup) went to the same film, Jerzy Skolimowski's Essential Killing. In the past, no one film had been given two major awards. Representing the jury, American director Quentin Tarantino appealed to Festival head Marco Müller to alter the rules. This rule change continues to be upheld for future editions of the Festival.

Following the Festival, Italian film critic Paolo Mereghetti criticised the decisions that the jury made in awarding prizes, and singled out Tarantino, accusing him of favoritism. He denied the charge.

Juries
The international juries of the 67th Venice International Film Festival were composed as follows:

Main Competition (Venezia 67)
 Quentin Tarantino, American director, writer, and actor (Jury President)
 Guillermo Arriaga, Mexican author, screenwriter, director and producer
 Ingeborga Dapkunaite, Lithuanian theatre and cinema actress
 Arnaud Desplechin, French director and screenwriter
 Danny Elfman, American composer, singer, songwriter and record producer
 Luca Guadagnino, Italian film director
 Gabriele Salvatores, Italian director and screenwriter

Horizons (Orizzonti)
 Shirin Neshat, Iranian visual artist (film, video, photography) (President) 
 Raja Amari, Tunisian director and script writer
 Lav Diaz, Filipino independent filmmaker
 Alexander Horwath, director of the Austrian Filmmuseum, former director of Viennale
 Pietro Marcello, Italian director

Opera Prima ("Luigi de Laurentiis" Award for a Debut Film)
 Fatih Akin, German director, screenwriter and producer (President)
 Nina Lath Gupta, Indian official of National Film Development Corporation of India
 Stanley Kwan, Hong Kong director and producer
 Samuel Maoz, Israeli director
 Jasmine Trinca, Italian actress

Controcampo Italiano
 Valerio Mastandrea, Italian film, stage and TV actor (President)
 Susanna Nicchiarelli, Italian director, scriptwriter and actress
 Dario Edoardo Viganò, Director of Vatican Television Center

Persol 3-D
 Shimizu Takashi, Japanese filmmaker (President)
 Jim Hoberman, American film critic and academic
 David Zamagni, Italian director and filmmaker

Official selection

In competition
The Leone d'oro (Golden Lion) award was won by Somewhere, directed by Sofia Coppola, a film based in part on Coppola's childhood as the daughter of acclaimed American director Francis Ford Coppola. Quentin Tarantino, the president of the jury that awarded the prize, hailed the film saying, "it grew and grew in our hearts, in our minds, in our affections". The jury's decision was unanimous. Upon receiving the award, Coppola paid credit to her father for "teaching me". The Russian film Silent Souls and the Chilean film Post Mortem had been considered favourites for the award.

The following films competed for the award:

Highlighted title indicates the Golden Lion winner.

Out of competition
The following films were shown out of competition.

Horizons
From 2010 on, this section, dedicated to new trends in world cinema, has opened itself to all "extra-format" works, while four new awards have been established for it.

Feature films

Highlighted title indicates the Orizzonti Award for Feature Film winner.

Short and medium-length films

Highlighted titles indicates the Orizzonti Awards for Short Film and for Medium-length winners.

Controcampo Italiano
The following films, representing "new trends in Italian cinema", were screened in this section:

In competition

Highlighted title indicates the Controcampo Italiano Prize winner.

Out of competition - Feature films and documentaries

Italian comedy retrospective
The following films were shown as part of a retrospective section on Italian comedy, titled The State of Things, spanning the years 1937 to 1988.

Autonomous sections

Venice International Film Critics' Week
The following films were selected for the 25th International Film Critics' Week:

Venice Days
The following films were selected for the 7th edition of Venice Days (Giornate Degli Autori) autonomous section:

Awards
Starting with the 67th edition of the festival, four new awards were established for the Orizzonti section: the Orizzonti Award (for feature films), the Special Jury Orizzonti Prize (for feature films), the Orizzonti Award for Short Films and the Orizzonti Award for Medium-length Films.

Official selection
The following Official selection awards were conferred at the festival:

In Competition (Venezia 67)
Golden Lion: Somewhere by Sofia Coppola
Silver Lion for Best Director: Álex de la Iglesia for Balada triste de trompeta (A Sad Trumpet Ballad)
Special Jury Prize: Essential Killing by Jerzy Skolimowski
Volpi Cup for Best Actor: Vincent Gallo for Essential Killing
Volpi Cup for Best Actress: Ariane Labed for Attenberg
Marcello Mastroianni Award for the best emerging actor or actress: Mila Kunis for Black Swan
Golden Osella for Best Cinematography: Mikhail Krichman for Silent Souls (Ovsyanki)
Golden Osella for Best Screenplay: Álex de la Iglesia for A Sad Trumpet Ballad (Balada triste de trompeta)
 Special Lion for Overall Work: Monte Hellman

Horizons (Orizzonti)
 Orizzonti Award: Verano de Goliat by Nicolás Pereda
 Special Jury Orizzonti Prize: The Forgotten Space by Noël Burch and Allan Sekula
 Orizzonti Award for Short Films: Coming Attractions by Peter Tcherkassky
 Orizzonti Award for Medium-length Films: Tse (Out) by Roee Rosen
 Special Mention: Jean Gentil by Laura Amelia Guzmán and Israel Cárdenas
 Venice Short Film Nominee for the European Film Awards: The External World by David Oreilly (conferred by the Horizons jury)

Controcampo Italiano
 Best Film: 20 Cigarettes by Aureliano Amadei
 Special Mention: Vinicio Marchioni for his role in 20 Cigarettes

Special awards
 Golden Lion for life achievement: John Woo
 Jaeger-Le Coultre Glory to the Filmmaker Award: Mani Ratnam
 Persol 3-D Award for Best Stereoscopic Film: Avatar by James Cameron
 L’Oréal Paris for the Cinema Award: Vittoria Puccini

Autonomous sections
The following official and collateral awards were conferred to films of the autonomous sections:

Venice International Film Critics' Week
 "Region of Veneto for quality cinema" Award: Beyond (Svinalängorna) by Pernilla August
 Christopher D. Smithers Foundation Special Award: Beyond by Pernilla August

Venice Days (Giornati degli Autori)
 Lion of the Future
 Luigi de Laurentis Award for a Debut Film: Cogunluk (Majority) by Seren Yüce
 Label Europa Cinemas Award: The Clink of Ice by (Le bruit des glaçons) by Bertrand Blier
 Special Mention: Incendies by Denis Villeneuve
 Biografilm Lancia Award: Incendies by Denis Villeneuve
 Lanterna Magica Award (Cgs): Dark Love (L’amore buio) by Antonio Capuano
 FEDIC Award: Dark Love by Antonio Capuano
 Special Mention: Afraid of the Dark (Hai paura del buio) by Massimo Coppola
 AIF Forfilmfest Award: Dark Love by Antonio Capuano
 Gianni Astrei Award: Dark Love by Antonio Capuano
 Cinema.Doc - Venice Days Selection: Il Sangue verde by Andrea Segre

Other collateral awards
The following collateral awards were conferred to films of the official selection:

 FIPRESCI Award:
 Best Film (Main competition): Silent Souls (Ovsyanki) by Aleksei Fedorchenko
 Best Film (Horizons): El sicario Room 164 by Gianfranco Rosi (Horizons)
 SIGNIS Award: Meek's Cutoff by Kelly Reichardt
 Special Mention: Silent Souls by Aleksei Fedorchenko
 Francesco Pasinetti Award (SNGCI): 
 Best Film: 20 Cigarettes by Aureliano Amadei (Controcampo Italiano)
 Best Actress: Alba Rohrwacher for The Solitude of Prime Numbers
 CICAE Award: Sleeping Beauty (La belle endormie) by Catherine Breillat
 Leoncino d'oro Agiscuola Award: Barney’s Version by Richard J. Lewis
Cinema for UNICEF Commendation: Miral by Julian Schnabel
 La Navicella – Venezia Cinema Award: The Ditch (Jiabiangou) by Wang Bing
 C.I.C.T. UNESCO Enrico Fulchignoni Award: Miral by Julian Schnabel
 Biografilm Lancia Award:
 I'm Still Here by Casey Affleck (Out of competition)
 A Letter to Elia by Martin Scorsese & Kent Jones (Out of competition)
 Surviving Life (Prezit svuj zivot) by Jan Švankmajer (Out of competition)
 20 Cigarettes by Aureliano Amadei (Controcampo Italiano)
 El Sicario - Room 164 by Gianfranco Rosi (Horizons)
 Nazareno Taddei Award: Silent Souls by Aleksei Fedorchenko
 CinemAvvenire Award: Essential Killing by Jerzy Skolimowski
 CinemAvvenire "Il cerchio non è rotondo" Award: Cirkus Columbia by Danis Tanović
 Equal Opportunity Award: Black Venus (Vénus noire) by Abdellatif Kechiche
 Future Film Festival Digital Award: Detective Dee and the Mystery of the Phantom Flame by Tsui Hark
 Special Mention: Zebraman 2: Attack on Zebra City & 13 Assassins by Miike Takashi
 Brian Award: Lost Kisses (I baci mai dati) by Roberta Torre
 Queer Lion Award: In the Future (En el futuro) by Mauro Andrizzi (Horizons)
 Arca Cinemagiovani Award:
 Best Film: A Sad Trumpet Ballad (Balada triste de trompeta) by Álex de la Iglesia
 Roberto Bognanno Prize: Potiche by François Ozon
 Lina Mangiacapre Award: Attenberg by Athina Rachel Tsangari
 Special Mention: Jafar Panahi for The Accordion (short)
 UK - Italy Creative Industries Award – Best Innovative Budget: Tajabone by Salvatore Mereu (Controcampo Italiano)
 Fondazione Mimmo Rotella: La pecora nera by Ascanio Celestini
 Premio Selezione Cinema.Doc - Official Selection: El sicario room 164 by Gianfranco Rosi (Horizons)
 Golden Mouse: Silent Souls by Aleksei Fedorchenko
 Silver Mouse: Incendies by Denis Villeneuve

References

External links

Venice Film Festival 2010 Awards on IMDb

Venice Film Festival
Venice Film Festival
Venice International Film Festival
Venice International Film Festival
Film
September 2010 events in Italy